Phrygian can refer to:
Anything relating to the region of Phrygia
Anything relating to the Phrygians, an ethnic group
Phrygian language, their language
Phrygian cap, once characteristic of the region
Phrygian helmet, used historically in Thracian, Dacian, Classical and Hellenistic Greek armies, and later among Romans
Phrygian mode in music
A follower of Montanism, an early Christian movement in Phrygia

Language and nationality disambiguation pages